Mott Avenue may refer to the following stations of the New York City Subway:

149th Street – Grand Concourse (IRT White Plains Road Line), in the Bronx; serving the 